Cancer Culture is the eighth studio album by Polish death metal band Decapitated. It was released on 27 May 2022 by Nuclear Blast. The band announced the album on March 17, 2022 and also released its title track. It is the band's first album to feature drummer James Stewart, and their first since Blood Mantra to feature bassist Paweł Pasek. They also revealed the album would feature guest performances from members of Jinjer and Machine Head.

Track listing

Personnel
Decapitated
 Rafał "Rasta" Piotrowski – vocals
 Wacław "Vogg" Kiełtyka – guitars
 James Stewart – drums
 Paweł Pasek – bass

Production
 Ted Jensen – production
 Fabio Timpanaro - cover art
 Jarek Szubrycht - lyrics
 Tomasz Zed Zalewski - engineering
 David Castillo - mixing

Charts

References

2022 albums
Decapitated (band) albums
Nuclear Blast albums